The Alzheimer's Drug Discovery Foundation (ADDF) is a nonprofit organization founded in 1998 by co-chairmen Leonard A. Lauder and Ronald S. Lauder of the Estée Lauder Companies cosmetics family  and led by Howard Fillit, a geriatrician and neuroscientist. The ADDF provides funding to scientists who are conducting promising, innovative Alzheimer's disease drug research worldwide. The ADDF funds early-stage research and early-phase clinical trials that might otherwise go unfunded. By supporting research projects around the world, it seeks to increase the chances of finding treatments for Alzheimer's disease, related dementias and cognitive aging. The ADDF has invested nearly $65 million to fund some 450 Alzheimer's drug discovery programs and clinical trials in academic centers and biotechnology companies in 18 countries.

The ADDF also publishes peer-reviewed scientific articles with the goal of accelerating and improving Alzheimer's disease drug discovery research.

Funding model

The ADDF is a biomedical venture philanthropy. Many of its grants are structured as investments, providing a return that is reinvested in new drug research. After initial ADDF funding, grantees have received commitments of over $2 billion in follow-on funding from government, pharmaceutical companies and venture capital firms to further advance drug research.

ADDF programs
Through its programs, the ADDF has invested close to $65 million to fund nearly 450 Alzheimer's drug discovery programs and clinical trials in academic centers and biotechnology companies in 18 countries. From 2000 to 2004, the ADDF provided seed funding for Amyvid, the first FDA-approved diagnostic test for Alzheimer's disease.

Preclinical Drug Discovery 
The ADDF's preclinical program funds research focused on translating existing knowledge about the underlying causes of Alzheimer's disease into drug discovery. Areas of research include: neuroprotection, tau-related therapies, ApoE, therapies, mitochondria function and inflammation. In 2013, 69 percent of the ADDF's drug portfolio was focused on preclinical drug discovery.

Program to Accelerate Clinical Trials 
Though more than 300 potential treatments for Alzheimer's have been shown to have some positive effect when tested in animals, most have not been tested in humans because of the high costs of even modest clinical trials. The ADDF's Program to Accelerate Clinical Trials (PACT) works to accelerate this process, to date giving 32 clinical stage programs the chance to generate safety and "proof-of-concept" data. The PACT program also supports targeted approaches to prevention as well as clinical biomarker development.

Through PACT, the ADDF is funding a number of "repurposing" clinical trials, whereby drugs developed for other indications (e.g., diabetes) are tested for their effectiveness in Alzheimer's disease. Because these drugs have already passed significant safety tests, the risk of failure is reduced and, if pharmaceuticals are found to be effective in Alzheimer's patients, they can be brought more rapidly to market.

Partnership Programs 
The ADDF partners with family foundations, government, non-profit organization, the pharmaceutical industry and corporate organizations to leverage collective funding power.

Scientific Conferences 
The ADDF hosts, sponsors and attends a number of scientific conferences, including the International Conference on Alzheimer's Drug Discovery and the Drug Discovery for Neurodegeneration Conference. The ADDF also organizes advisory panels focused on key issues surrounding drug discovery and development for Alzheimer's.

ADDF ACCESS 
The ADDF's ACCESS program connects scientists with networks of collaborators, consultants, contract research organizations (CROs) and experimental tools. It provides Alzheimer's scientists with educational materials on the drug discovery process and guidance and expertise on the process of selecting and managing CRO relationships.

Cognitive Vitality 
The ADDF's microsite, Cognitive Vitality, provide evidence-based answers to pressing questions about healthy brain aging. Resources include: 
 Expert ratings of scientific evidence for and against suggested cognitive vitality strategies including: health management and drugs; nutrition and supplements; and environmental and physical considerations
 Practical information on safety, efficacy and drug dosage
 Digestible translations of scientific findings

Events 
Every year, the ADDF hosts a series of events to raise awareness and funds to support Alzheimer's research and drug development. They include:
The Great Ladies Fashion Show and Luncheon, an annual spring runway show and lunch recognizing female advocates in Alzheimer's. Previous events have included designs and special appearances by Erdem, Jason Wu and Carolina Herrera.
The Connoisseur's Dinner, an evening of art and wine celebrating scientific progress in Alzheimer's research.
The Fall Symposium and Luncheon, a luncheon and learning event featuring a keynote speech or panel highlighting progress in cognitive decline research and drug development.

References

External links 
 Official Website

Medical and health foundations in the United States
Social finance
Mental health organizations in New York (state)